Rengsdorf is a former Verbandsgemeinde ("collective municipality") in the district of Neuwied, in Rhineland-Palatinate, Germany. In January 2018 it was merged into the new Verbandsgemeinde Rengsdorf-Waldbreitbach. The seat of the Verbandsgemeinde was in Rengsdorf.

The Verbandsgemeinde Rengsdorf consisted of the following Ortsgemeinden ("local municipalities"):

 Anhausen 
 Bonefeld 
 Ehlscheid 
 Hardert 
 Hümmerich 
 Kurtscheid 
 Meinborn 
 Melsbach 
 Oberhonnefeld-Gierend 
 Oberraden 
 Rengsdorf
 Rüscheid 
 Straßenhaus 
 Thalhausen

Former Verbandsgemeinden in Rhineland-Palatinate